Michael David Cobham (11 May 1930 – 25 March 2018) was a British film and TV producer and director, best known for the film Tarka the Otter. He was also a first-class cricketer.

Cricket career
Cobham was educated at Stowe School, where he played for the school cricket team, before going up to Corpus Christi College, Cambridge to read natural sciences. He played minor counties cricket for Berkshire in the 1948 Minor Counties Championship, making five appearances. He later made an appearance in first-class cricket for the Free Foresters against Cambridge University at Fenner's in 1953. He bowled ten wicket-less overs in Cambridge University's first-innings, before taking the wickets of Mike Bushby and Dennis Silk in their second-innings to finish with figures of 2 for 21 from seven overs. He failed to score while batting, being dismissed in the Free Foresters' first-innings by Myles Arkell and Raman Subba Row in their second-innings.

Filmmaking career
Cobham directed the BBC's first wildlife film Vanishing Hedgerows in 1972. He also directed and produced the children's TV series Bernard's Watch, Brendon Chase, The Secret World of Polly Flint, Out of Sight, Woof! and the wildlife-orientated Seal Morning (1986). His wildlife films include The Goshawk (1968), and To Build a Fire (1969), narrated by Orson Welles. He also directed a BBC series about Japan, In the Shadow of Fujisan (BBC One 1987 and BBC Four 2009). Other projects included One Pair of Eyes (1970) about the sculptor John Skeaping, Survival in Limbo (1976) starring Duncan Carse, and he was also the director/producer for BP's film of Donald Campbell's Land Speed Record attempt at Utah in 1960.

Books
Cobham's first book, A Sparrowhawk's Lament: How British Breeding Birds of Prey Are Faring, was published in 2014; his next book, Bowland Beth: The Life of an English Hen Harrier, a study of the persecution of the hen harrier on the grouse moors of the Forest of Bowland, was published in 2017.

Death
Cobham died of a stroke on 25 March 2018 at the age of 87. He is survived by his wife Liza Goddard, ex-president of the Hawk and Owl Trust, of which he was vice-president.

References

External links
 
David Cobham Youtube Channel
BFI Filmography Cobham, David
 

1930 births
2018 deaths
People from Bridlington
People educated at Stowe School
Alumni of Corpus Christi College, Cambridge
English cricketers
Berkshire cricketers
Free Foresters cricketers
British film directors
British film producers
20th-century British businesspeople